Moro no Brasil is a 2002 documentary film directed by the Finnish filmmaker Mika Kaurismäki.

Synopsis 
A musical voyage into the heart of the largest country in Latin America, a legacy of the successive inhabitants of Brazil: Indians, Europeans, Africans... All these cultural influences have piled up in the same way that geological stratifications do, offering a variety of rhythms: Forró, Frevo, Embolada, Samba... To make this documentary, the Finnish director Mika Kaurismäki has traveled 4,000 kilometers, crossed three states in the Northwest of Brazil, and spoken to more than thirty musicians, most of them street musicians and unknown to foreigners.

Awards 
 Nyon Visions du Réel, Switzerland 2007

External links 
 

Creative Commons-licensed documentary films
Brazilian documentary films
Finnish documentary films
German documentary films
Brazilian music
2002 documentary films
2002 films
2000s German films